Dennis William Sullivan (September 28, 1882 – June 2, 1956) was a center fielder in Major League Baseball who played from 1905 through 1909 for the Washington Senators (1905), Boston Americans / Red Sox (1907–1908) and Cleveland Naps (1908–1909). A native of Hillsboro, Wisconsin, he batted left-handed and threw right-handed.

A fine outfielder with a light bat, Sullivan went 0-for-11 in his rookie season for the Senators. He received a great deal of playing time with Boston before Tris Speaker replaced him at center field. His most productive season came in 1907, when he posted career-highs in games (144), batting average (.245), hits (135), runs (73), RBI (26) and on-base percentage (.315). Traded to Cleveland in the 1908 midseason, he also played seven games for the Naps in parts of two seasons.

In a four-year career, Sullivan was a .239 hitter (221-for-925) with one home run and 51 RBI in 255 games, including 106 runs, 25 doubles, eight triples, and 30 stolen bases.

Sullivan died at the age of 73 in West Los Angeles, California.

External links

Retrosheet

1882 births
1956 deaths
Boston Americans players
Boston Red Sox players
Cleveland Naps players
Washington Senators (1901–1960) players
Major League Baseball center fielders
Baseball players from Wisconsin
Minor league baseball managers
Minneapolis Millers (baseball) players
Fargo (minor league baseball) players
Winnipeg (minor league baseball) players
Toledo Mud Hens players
Kansas City Blues (baseball) players
Indianapolis Indians players
Fargo-Moorhead Graingrowers players
Fort William-Port Arthur Canucks players
St. Joseph Drummers players
Minnesota Golden Gophers baseball coaches
People from Hillsboro, Wisconsin